Heinrich "Heini" Isser (12 May 1928 – 18 May 2004) was an Austrian bobsledder-luger who competed during the 1950s and 1960s. He was born in Matrei in Osttirol.

Luge career
Isser won five medals at the European luge championships with two golds (Men's doubles: 1952, 1955) and three silvers (Men's singles: 1953, Men's doubles: 1951, 1953).

Bobsled career
Isser also won a bronze medal in the Four-man event at the 1962 FIBT World Championships in Garmisch-Partenkirchen, West Germany. He also finished tenth in the four-man event as well as twelfth in the two-man event at the 1956 Winter Olympics in Cortina d'Ampezzo.

References

Bobsleigh four-man world championship medalists since 1930
Olympic results in Four-man bobsleigh: 1948-64

Heinrich Isser's obituary 

1928 births
2004 deaths
Austrian male bobsledders
Austrian male lugers
Olympic bobsledders of Austria
Bobsledders at the 1956 Winter Olympics